Arch of the atlas can refer to:
 Anterior arch of the atlas
 Posterior arch of the atlas